The Miracle of Forgiveness is a book written by Spencer W. Kimball while he was a member of Quorum of the Twelve Apostles of the Church of Jesus Christ of Latter-day Saints (LDS Church). He later became the church's president.

Content 
Originally published in 1969, the book discusses the issues of repentance and forgiveness through Jesus Christ in LDS theology. It is primarily written for an LDS audience. It is notable for exposing sins, including:

Murder, adultery, theft, cursing, unholiness in masters, disobedience in servants, unfaithfulness, improvidence, hatred of God, disobedience to husbands, lack of natural affection, high-mindedness, flattery, lustfulness, infidelity, indiscretion, backbiting, whispering, lack of truth, striking, brawling, quarrelsomeness, unthankfulness, inhospitality, deceitfulness, irreverence, boasting, arrogance, pride, double-tongued talk, profanity, slander, corruptness, thievery, embezzlement, despoiling, covenant-breaking, incontinence, filthiness, ignobleness, filthy communications, impurity, foolishness, slothfulness, impatience, lack of understanding, unmercifulness, idolatry, blasphemy, denial of the Holy Ghost, Sabbath breaking, envy, jealousy, malice, maligning, vengefulness, implacability, bitterness, clamor, spite, defiling, reviling, evil speaking, provoking, greediness for filthy lucre, disobedience to parents, anger, hate, covetousness, bearing false witness, inventing evil things, fleshliness, heresy, presumptuousness, abomination, insatiable appetite, instability, ignorance, self-will, speaking evil of dignitaries, becoming a stumbling block; and in our modern language, masturbation, petting, fornication, adultery, homosexuality; and every sex perversion, every hidden and secret sin and all unholy and impure practices.

Kimball defines repentance as the perfect, successful abandonment of sin, through the following actions:
conviction, in which "the sinner consciously recognizes his sin."
abandonment of sin
confession to church authorities and/or other parties wronged by the sin
restitution
keeping God's commandments
forgiving others

"Trying is not sufficient. Nor is repentance complete when one merely tries to abandon sin," Kimball writes. The objective of repentance, he writes, is to obtain "perfection" as a prerequisite for achieving "immortality and eternal life. ... This progress toward eternal life is a matter of achieving perfection. Living all the commandments guarantees total forgiveness of sins and assures one of exaltation through that perfection which comes by complying with the formula the Lord gave us. ... Being perfect means to triumph over sin."

Reputation in Mormonism

According to Kimball's son, Edward, "[T]he book filled a need, as evidenced by the printing of half a million copies in English and sixteen other languages between its publication in 1969 and his death in 1985 .... By 1998 the total in all languages was roughly estimated at 1.6 million copies."

This book has received numerous accolades from LDS Church authorities. Ezra Taft Benson, who succeeded Kimball as president of the church, urged all church members "to read and reread President Spencer W. Kimball's book." More recently, in the November 2004 General Conference, LDS Church apostle Richard G. Scott called it a "masterly work" and, prior to that, "a superb guide to forgiveness through repentance."  Scott recommended reading the last two chapters first, to better appreciate the book's message.

Although from 1976 to 1988 the LDS Church encouraged missionaries to read the book, since then it has not been part of the "approved missionary library". The book went out of print in 2015.

The book is controversial, even among Mormons, for its treatment of masturbation, homosexuality, premarital sex, and rape. Rape survivors have been published criticizing parts of the book including the phrase "It is better to die in defending one's [virginity] than to live having lost it without a struggle" as victim blaming and shaming rhetoric that contributes to rape culture. Allen Bergin, a retired psychologist from Brigham Young University and past president of the Association of Mormon Counselors and Psychotherapists (AMCAP), felt the useful parts were "overshadowed by a host of negatives and also outdated policies that the church itself doesn't even endorse any more." Years after publication, Kimball reportedly remarked that its tone may have been too strong.

See also
Beliefs and practices of The Church of Jesus Christ of Latter-day Saints
Law of chastity
Sexuality and Mormonism
Homosexuality and The Church of Jesus Christ of Latter-day Saints
Masturbation and The Church of Jesus Christ of Latter-day Saints

References

External links
 Full text of the book
 Free audio book version

1969 books
LDS non-fiction
1969 in Christianity
Bookcraft books
Works by apostles (LDS Church)